Kurmauta is a village in Nautan Gram Panchayat of Nautan (community development block) of Siwan district in Indian state of Bihar. It is one out of several villages of Nautan block.

Nautan town is the headquarter of the village.

See also
Siwan Subdivision
Administration in Bihar

References

External links

Villages in Siwan district